Vengeance of the Bride is a 2022 South Korean television series starring Park Ha-na, Kang Ji-seub, Park Yoon-jae and Oh Seung-ah. It premiered on KBS2 on October 10, 2022.

Synopsis
A desperate revenge story of a woman who becomes the daughter-in-law of an enemy in search of her biological mother.

Cast
 Park Ha-na as Eun Seo-yeon 
 Lee Ah-ra as young Eun Seo-yeon / Kang Ba-ram - The protagonist of the story, Eun Seo-yeon is a naive makeup artist who is clueless about her own life. However, after realizing that Kang Baek-san killed her family, she will transform into a vengeful woman, pledging a bitter vengeance like a winter wind.
 Kang Ji-seop as Kang Tae-poong 
 Son Jun-hee as young Kang Tae-poong - Kang Baek-san's son who is trained to become the CEO of LeBlanc. Eun Seo-yeon will marry him as part of her vengeance.
 Park Yoon-jae as Yoon San-deu - Eun Seo-yeon's childhood friend and lover who will become a victim of Kang Baek-san's evilness.
 Oh Seung-ah as Kang Ba-da - Kang Ba-da is the ruthless and evil chaebol who is full of insecurities and jealousy. Since she was a child, she harbors enmity to Ba-ram. She loves San-deul so much that she is willing to kill and commit heinous acts especially to Eun Seo-yeon.
 Choi Young-wan as Bae Soon-young
 Son Chang-min as Kang Baek-san - Ba-da and Tae-poong's heartless father. He is the main antagonist of the story. He plotted to kill Ba-ram's father to steal his wealth and company. He is blinded for his obsession to power and money that he is willing to hurt his children to hide his crimes.
 Ji Soo-won as Jeong Mo-yeon - Eun Seo-yeon's biological mother who suffers from amnesia.
 Kim Young-ok as Park Yong-ja
 Choi Su-rin as Nam In-soon - Kang Baek-san's arrogant and paranoid wife. 
 Bae Geu-rin as Hong Jo-yi - Jeong Mo-yeon's wealthy daughter who works as a reporter. Originally kind and caring, but her unhealthy obsession to Tae-poong and jealousy to Eun Seo-yeon will drive her to plot evil schemes against her mother and Ba-ram's real identity.
 Joo Ji-won as Seo Yoon-hee
 Kim Kwang-young as Na Kwang-pil
 Kim Hye-sun 
 Ahn So-jin as Gang Ba-lan
 Cha Kwang-soo as Ma Dae-geun
 Choi Young-wan as Bae Soon-young

Special appearances
 Nam Sung-jin as Jin Il-suk 
 Im Ho as Yoon Jae-ha

Production
The series brings together writer Song Jeong-rim and actress Park Ha-na after three years of Love in Sadness 2019. On September 14, 2022, it was confirmed that Kang Ji-sub, Park Yoon-jae will be joining the series. The first reading of the script of the series was held at KBS headquarters on September 20, 2022, in presence of the cast and production staff.

Release
On September 19, 2022, KBS released the first teaser for the series, along with announcing the premiere date. The series premiered on October 10, 2022.

Viewership

Awards and nominations

Notes

References

External links
  
 
 

Korean Broadcasting System television dramas
2022 South Korean television series debuts
2023 South Korean television series endings
Television series by Chorokbaem Media
Korean-language television shows
South Korean melodrama television series
Television series about revenge